Kinter Nunatak is the southernmost of the Sky-Hi Nunataks in eastern Palmer Land, Antarctica. It was named by the Advisory Committee on Antarctic Names in 1987 after Paul M. Kinter of the School of Electrical Engineering, Cornell University, Ithaca, NY, who carried out research at Siple Station on VLF wave emissions and interaction in 1980–81.

References

Nunataks of Palmer Land